Songpa-gu (Hangul: 송파구) is a district of Seoul, South Korea. Previously known as Wiryeseong, the first capital of the kingdom of Baekje, Songpa is located in the southeastern part of Seoul, the capital city of South Korea. With roughly 647,000 residents, Songpa is also the largest district in Seoul by population.

Songpa was at the center of 1988 Seoul Olympics, and most of the sports facilities associated with that event are located within the district.

In 2009, Songpa was named one of the world's most livable cities at the LivCom Awards presented by the United Nations Environment Programme.

History

Hanseong Baekje era (BC 18 ~ AD 660)
In 18 BC, the kingdom of Baekje founded its capital city, Wiryeseong (위례성), in what is believed to be the modern-day Songpa District. Baekje subsequently developed from a member state of the Mahan confederacy into one of the Three Kingdoms of Korea. There are several city fortress remains in the Seoul area dating from this time. Pungnap Toseong (풍납토성), an earthen wall in Pungnap-dong (near Jamsil) in the southeastern part of Seoul, is widely believed to be the site of Wiryeseong, the first capital of Baekje. Yet another earthen wall, Mongchon Toseong (몽촌토성), is located nearby and also dates back to the early Baekje era.

Joseon Dynasty
Songpa was historically a hub of commercial and military activity as the location of several markets and the site of many battles of the Joseon era.

1970s
Songpa, once a calm and rural area, underwent major land development efforts in the 1970s, which transformed the region into a new, urban town.

1980s
Songpa hosted the 1986 Asian Games and the 1988 Summer Olympics. Seoul Olympic Stadium and Olympic Park were constructed for these events, along with a multi-lane expressway, large-scale apartment complexes, and commercial facilities.

In 1988, Songpa split from the Gangdong District and became its own administrative district.

2009
In pursuit of sustainable and environment-friendly urban development and participatory local autonomy, Songpa is being developed as an autonomous district of Seoul. With the legacy of Baekjae, it is aiming to become a world-class city that leads the future of Korea.

Economy

In Songpa, these are the Garden5, is the hub of Northeast Asia's distribution market, and Garak Market for agricultural and aquatic products Asia's biggest market. Lotte World with 112 stories is planned to be built. Songpa eased regulation against construction in order to provide an optimal environment for economic activities. One factor that makes Songpa's future optimistic is the residents' community sentiment. At a time when the global economy's gloomy, public workers raised money to help create jobs for the jobless in the region.

Foundation of high-tech business zone

Songpa District draws its future as an "Economically revived district." To achieve this goal, a high-tech business zone is being built in Munjeong-dong. This zone falls into three themes: future business with next generation semi-conduct, future automobile, digital contents, next generation battery, bio pharmaceutics, digital TV and display and next generation mobile set; the region's specialized business with pharmaceutics, medical instruments, medicine, health care and construction and engineering service; administrational function with court, prosecutor's office and police office. Songpa plans to manage this three-sector zone as a driving force for the future.

Garden 5

"Garden 5 is the biggest hub for distribution in Asia."
One-stop shopping mall Garden 5 is the biggest distribution hub in Korea and meets the demand of distribution, culture and leisure. It consists of five special blocks: 'Garden 5 Life' with more than 8,300 shops; the process manufacture complex 'Garden 5 works' where processing products like press, turnery, bolt and light are manufactured; the large resale facility 'Garden 5 Tool'; distribution block; activation block.

Remodeling of Garak Market

"It is hub market for agricultural and marine products in Northeast Asia."
Garak Market is going through remodeling until 2020 and will be set with eco-friendly products, convenient and clean environment and modernized distribution system, to be hub market in Northeast Asia.
Through remodeling, the market will be transformed into theme park style market with eco-friendly underground and green, cultural park-like style on the ground. Construction for remodeling will be one by one in order, not to interrupt the business.

Second Lotte World Building with 112 stories

Planned to be built in Sincheon-dong, this building will be 555-meter tall and has 624,642 m2 of floor space. It will have 112 ground floors and 5 underground floors. An estimated 1.7 trillion won will be invested and more than 23,000 jobs will be created in building a second Lotte World Building. It is expected to create Asia's largest commercial zone and 2.5 million employment effect annually.

Revitalization of regional economy

"To overcome economic crisis, public workers at Songpa-gu office saved fringe benefits and service operation expenses. As a result, 1,270 jobs (worth 10 billion won) were created."
Focusing on reduction in unemployment rate as a way to overcome economic crisis, Songpa District launched a handful of projects.
First of all, Songpa benchmarked the project of the US when it hired the job-seekers with higher educational degrees for building data base during the Great Depression. Songpa employed 120 people in computerizing important data of Songpa District. Through data base computerization, Songpa contributed to green growth by saving paper.
Special budget of 5 billion won that was raised through savings of incentives, fringe benefits and service operation expenses was used in creating 1,270 jobs including administrative home-delivery service, stop smoking promotion, welfare servicemanship and helper for the elderly.

Town planning

"Songpa contributed to regional economy by easing construction regulation."
Songpa seeks to revitalize regional economy by easing construction regulation through town planning.
"Olympic Street maintenance and improvement project", for instance, is a project introduced to transfer motel zones in Bang-i, Sincheon and Jamsil, which was built for the Seoul Olympic 20 years ago to accommodate foreign visitors, into commercial building zones. Through the project, Songpa contributed to revitalizing regional economy by securing land required for business buildings.
"Songpa Daero maintenance and improvement project" is a town planning that is to develop the 283,500 m2 area around Seokchon Station intersection and Songpa Daero into a commercial area. Carrying out the project, Songpa took the lead in developing the economy by easing construction regulation and upgrading land use regulation.

'Fallen Ginkgo Leaves' into tourism material

"Songpa makes use of everything, even fallen leaves."
Songpa District maximizes the effectiveness of resources, by sending surplus resources, to other towns where they are needed.
In the fall, ginkgo leaves are all but are useless, being a headache. Songpa gathers these fallen leaves and sends them to Nam-i Island, a tourist attraction in Gangwon Province, so that the leaves can be used as a sightseeing for tourists. Songpa District saves disposal cost by 12 million won a year, thanks to the creative idea.

Resource recycling

"Songpa saves money, protects the environment and shares resources at the same time at recycling plaza."
As school uniforms are as expensive as high quality suits these days, putting more burden on parents, Songpa District runs a recycling pool for used uniforms and books. In this center, a school uniform costs only 4,000 won. In 2008, 1,541 uniforms were sold and 116 were exchanged among the total 2,043 donated.
There are recycling centers in Geoyeo-dong and Jamsil-dong and the products are very reasonably priced compared to market prices. Products ranging from home appliance to cloths and shoes are qualified as they go through repair process after being donated from residents.
Songpa makes a good use of donated products and protects the environment at the same time, and more importantly, its residents share goods and have warmheart.

Education
Songpa District is implementing a variety of education policies by expanding libraries, supporting improvement of school environment, providing home-stay for foreigners from Sister City, promoting public English education and supporting students from low-income families and alienated regions. These policies are getting fruitful results as they help produce human resource with great skills, provide a lifelong education for the residents, tap and develop individuals with talents and, finally, make a better community.

Library expansion

There are 4 libraries called "Small Library on Pine Tree Hill" in Songpa District. They are small but easy to access, as they are close to residential areas. They are dubbed "Close-to-Life Library."
Through the "School Library Open-to-The-Public" system, Songpa District turned unused areas at schools into libraries open to residents. It is based on a win-win strategy since Songpa District could save money in its budget by using unused spaces in schools while the schools can supply more books supported by Songpa-gu office.
Unlike typical libraries, "Children-Only Library" provides children with a playground where they can enjoy playing as well as reading, and has more than 30,000 books and various facilities such as a child-care room, a theater and a foreign book room, all of which provoke children's imagination.

School zone safety

In 37 school zones in Songpa, CCTV cameras (90 inside and 17 outside of schools) are installed to prevent accidents and crimes. Songpa District also makes every effort to ensure safe routes to schools by paving access roads to schools with vivid colors, paving non-skid treads, building speed bumps, safety barriers, traffic signals and traffic safety signs, and painting traffic lanes.

Improvement of school environment

In order to provide a pleasant and safe environment in and around schools, Songpa District supports various programs: Songpa supports operational costs for school libraries, improvement of facilities for providing meals at schools, expansion of video and audio equipment, replacement of desks and chairs and installation of artificial grass, all of which help provide the best environment for education.

Child care center

Songpa District opened "Children-Only Multiplex Facility," which has a theater, experiential education room, kid's book cafe and cafeteria. This facility is aimed at provoking children's imagination and helping them face challenges and also respect for their neighbors.
There are 33 child-care centers run by Songpa District to ease financial burden on parents. 6 centers specializing in infant care help working moms do their jobs without worrying about child-care while working. Another 25 child-care centers are operated from 7:30 pm to midnight especially for double income families and single-parent families.

Student exchange with international sister city

Through the system, 100 students visit the sister city every summer. Students from Songpa and Christchurch, New Zealand, experience each other's culture and life for a month at home-stay houses in the sister city. Students from the two regions better understand another's culture while introducing their own to others, To do so, they feel proud of their own culture and get more global sense at the same time.
The program provides foreign students with an opportunity to experience Korean culture, learn more about the Asian country and build a closer friendship. In the last year, there was a group from Christchurch who enjoyed their time.

Education for gifted and talented students

Songpa District designated a school district covering 12,852 m2 area in Munjeongdong development district in order to invite autonomous private high schools, high schools with special purposes, or schools for foreign students.
Songpa District also supports 120 students in 2 schools for special education for the gifted in mathematics and science.

Improvement of public education

Songpa established programs for English education for primary schools through "Culture Experience English Class", 260 students from 37 primary schools in Songpa go on a field trip using only English. "English Village Tour" is for sixth grade students, through which they stay for 3 days in the specially built village Pungnap Camp using English only. Songpa will be allocating native English-speaking tutors in every primary school by 2010 and specially supporting 19 schools (12 primary, and 7 secondary schools) by backing "After-School English Teacher" that would take charge of after-school, supplementary lessons and special activity classes. By making these efforts, Songpa District supports English education in the era of globalization while helping relieve parents with financial burden, paying for private education.

Support for students from low-income families

For students from low-income or jobless families, Songpa adopted "One-Account-per-One-citizen" movement in which 10 residents save 10,000 won a month for a year to help one student. As of May 2009, 673.8 million won is saved in 5,615 bank accounts, and 93.5 million won was granted to 103 students. Songpa aims to save a total of 5 billion won by 2011.
"Mentorship Program" is an after-class program for students from low-income families, under which mentors consisting of college students, current and former teachers and other volunteers visit students once a week for a year to help the study and counsel them. This man-to-man program is the largest of its kind in Seoul.

Educational program for women

Special training program for women
To support women's economic activities, Songpa opens "Town-visiting Local Tax Law Fair" that helps women better understand local tax law by explaining diverse taxable and non-taxable laws and pretest cases filed against the office.

There is a "Car Maintenance Class for Female Drivers", which is becoming popular as it teaches to how to change a tire and to take emergency measures.

Culture

Songpa District tries to maintain health and mental well-being of its people by holding enjoyable festivals and artistic events, by supporting athletic organizations, and by building sports facilities.

Art centers

"Songpa Culture & Art Center is Seoul's landmark, just like the Opera House in Sydney."
Take a look at the fact that Songpa is forming an art-belt consisting of Songpa Culture and Art Center, Charlotte Musical Center and Woori Financial Art Hall, and one would find that Songpa District is planning to be the mecca of artistic performances like Broadway in New York.
First of all, Songpa Culture and Art Center is planned to be completed by 2011 on the eastern side of Seokchon Lake. The center will accommodate as many as 1,500 people with its 3 floors and 2 underground floors. Various genres of arts including musical, concert, ballet and modern dance will be performed at the center located by a beautiful lake especially at night, driving Songpa to the mecca of culture and art.
The weight lifting stadium in Olympic Park was transformed into a musical theater Woori Financial Art Hall. This hall with 1,260 seats is fine and modernized. Charlotte Musical Center, another art hall with its interior and exterior of medieval European design performs more than 1,000 musicals a year. Thanks to the hall and the center exclusively designed for musicals, Songpa deserves to be an art district.

Hanseong Baekje Culture Festival

"The area was founded as the capital of Baekje Kingdom, the rein power of East Asia, for about 500 years when it had the most flourishing and glorious culture in history."
The period is called "Hanseong Baekje" and lasted for 493 years from 2,000 years ago when Baekje's founder King Onjo established Hanam-wiryeseong as its capital until the capital was replaced with Wungjin.
Hanseong Baekje period had an elegant culture and powerful national defense force. In an effort to memorize the ancestors' spirit, Songpa holds Hanseong Baekje Culture Festival almost every year since 1994. The festival is gaining more popularity as there are enjoyable events, including a history and culture street parade, Baekje culture experience events, folk performances and a Baekje costume show.
Designated as a culture festival by the Ministry of Culture and Tourism in 2008, Hanseong Baekje Culture Festival virtually became Korea's representative festival.
To memorize Hanseong Baekje's history, Songpa District is planning to build "Hanseong Baekje Museum" in which the antiques and remains not only from Hanseong Baekje Period but also from prehistoric age and the era of Three States will be exhibited, so that visitors can better understand Songpa's 2,000-year history.

Hanseong Baekje Cultural Festival is a festival that reenacts Hanseong Baekje's tradition and cultural. 
Baekje is one of Korea ancient nation(B.C. 18 – A.D. 660). The capital of Baekje had been located in Seoul for about 470 years(B.C. 1 – AD. 476). Historical sites and antiquities of Baekje were discovered in Seoul. 
To remember the history of Baekje, Hanseong Baekje Cultural Festival is held every year (September) in Olympic Park, Songpa-Gu, Seoul Korea. You can experience Holography, Riders ' equation, Ancient Tomb of Baekje, Baekje Experience Village, and Historical cultural distance matrix. 
In 2017, the festival was held during September 21–24 in Olympic park.
More detailed information can be found at: http://hanseong.songpa.go.kr/

Local Events

"In festivals, tradition and contemporary arts are in harmony, while Korea and the world are combined."
In spring, more than 25,000 people visit "Seokchon Lake and Seongnae stream Festival" a day to enjoy the cherry blossom, which was planted and raised by the residents. In the festival, people enjoy cherry blossoms all day at a variety of musical concerts and participate cherry blossom road walking event, photo contest and writing contest.
Dan-o is a traditional holiday on the fifth day of the fifth month of the calendar, when ancestors used to pray for a good harvest for the year as the sunlight of the day is believed to be the brightest for the year. Among the most enjoyable traditional plays are seesawing and Pungmulnori
Koreans celebrate the first full moon day of the lunar year when the full moon is the biggest and the brightest, by praying for their hopes. Through traditional rites including bridge-treading rite, a tug of war and Catherine wheel game, festival participants learn Korea's cooperative values and have fun.

Performance

"There are various artistic performances staged in beautiful nature."
Thanks to waterside stage constructed at Seokchon Lake and Seongnae stream, the dirty lake and stream were restored into an eco-friendly park where the residents enjoy both the beautiful nature and artistic performances in diverse genres including classical music, opera, jazz dance and fusion music performed on the waterside stage.
Korea's traditional folk song performance is staged on every Sunday in Seoul Nori Madang that is aimed at promoting Korean traditional folk songs. People enjoy traditional folk plays designated as intangible culture assets like farm band, masked dance, classical dance, farm music and other folk songs. The domed hall accommodates 2,500 audiences, and performances are staged for four seasons.
There is another artistic stage for Songpa residents with a higher desire of culture and arts. "Suyo-mudae" stages noble artistic performances like plays, operas and musicals on every Wednesday in Songpa Gumin Hall run by Songpa District.

Songpa-gu Art Troupes

"Songpa has 6 world class art troupes."
To help the residents fulfill their desire of culture and art, and to develop and expand local culture and art, Songpa District makes every effort in building the district as "a mecca of culture and art" by establishing Songpa District's own art troupes.
Songpa runs a choir that won a number of national competitions, a symphony orchestra that was formed to promote classical music, a ballet troupe beyond genres from classical to contemporary, a folk art troupe formed to promote Korean traditional arts in Songpa's sister cities home and abroad, and silver choir and silver orchestra, both of which are showing the power of the elderly in national events and TV and radio music shows.
Songpa District's art troupes voluntarily do their jobs for the community. Playing a major part in promoting Songpa District, the troupes are the so-called preachers of art.

Environment

Songpa District is constantly thriving to be the district with the best environment while also allowing its residents live a happy life.
To fight against global warming, Songpa District is implementing new policies responding to the climate change, including the Waterway Project under which nearby streams are to be linked to one another. This ambitious project is the residents' pride.
Songpa tries to build a cleaner environment by transferring an unacceptable facility to the outer area, by improving transportation system responding to the increase in transportation volume, and by expanding parks and green zones.
Songpa's living environment is aimed to be the best in the world.

Solar power plant "Nanum" to fulfill welfare while protecting the environment
"Profit earned by the power plant is used to support utility fees in low-income families in Songpa."
Songpa District invests 300 million won in Solar Power Plant Nanum project, and 25% of the profit earned by the power plant is spent for low-income households' utility fee, another 25% goes to people in need in the third world and the other 50% is invested in the second Nanum plant.
An estimated 600 million won will be used to support low-income families in Songpa for the next 15 years. Playing a critical role in reducing air pollution while helping people in need, this project created a sensation in the nation.
Alongside the walking course by Jangji stream, 44 street lights are installed with eco-friendly LED solar lights, contributing to energy saving. One solar street light produces 225W of electricity an hour, and stays on for 3 days when it is exposed to the sun for four hours.

Songpa takes the lead in responding to the climate change

"Songpa's policies against the climate change were introduced in the summit talks of C40."

In "Climate Exhibition" during C40 summit talks designed to build cooperation among major cities aimed to be low carbon dioxide cities, Songpa's policies against global warming were introduced. The EXPO ensured Songpa District's position as a leading community in Korea to cope with the climate change by demonstrating the accomplishment effectively. During the EXPO, Songpa District's best practices to deal with the climate change, such as 'Songpa Nanum powerhouse',' Home Doctor', 'Songpa SPB (the unattended bicycle rental)', 'A model apartment for coping with the climate change', and the accomplishment of the project 'the city on the water' was presented on the site. And also, a generator that charges cell phone by riding a bicycle was displayed on 'a climate play ground'.

※ C40 Large Cities Climate Summit (The summit of the C40 Cities Climate Leadership Group)
The alliance of large cities which feel responsible for discharging over 80% of the Global 'greenhouse gases' to cope with the climate change, established in London, 2005.
(1st summit - London, 2nd - New York, 3rd - Seoul)

Songpa organized "Green Songpa Committee" for the first time among Korea's municipal governments. The environment governance organization consisting of environmental specialists, NGOs, businessmen, residents and government officers evaluate and advise the district's environment policies. The committee is taking the lead in environmental initiatives.
Songpa District established "CO2 Mileage" policy in an effort to reduce green house gas emission. Under the policy, the amount of saved energy including electricity, gas and water from every home is counted by points, and residents use the points like cash. Songpa District plans to encourage half of its residents to participate in the voluntary policy by 2010.
As Songpa has always been making every effort to fight against global warming by implementing effective and creative policies, it produces fruitful results.

District of Water

"Songpa District is a pleasant and beautiful area with nearby lake and streams."
Songpa District will link four nearby streams (Han River, Seongnae stream, Jangji stream and Tan stream) to one another through the dubbed Waterway Project. Songpa will be a unique island-like district when Waterway Project is completed by 2012, which is aimed at building Songpa an eco-friendly district where water, nature and human being are harmonized with one another.
Nature Eco Network is a 27 km long forest with a willow volley and a reserve of wild lives. In Walk Network, people can sense Songpa's history and culture while taking a walk, and feel the fresh air when riding a bicycle on Bicycle Network.
The Seokchon lake, which was generated from the Han River as the result of the multiple purpose development of Jamsil in the 1970s, had been averted by the residents because of a nasty smell, in spite of the fact that it's the only lake in the downtown of Seoul. The smell came from water pollution from concrete materials. But, in the 2000s, it was reborn as the real rest area where attract the visitors of 20,000~30,000 on weekdays, over 50,000 on weekends and are the nests for animals and plants including aquatic plants. And, this is the result of the development project for the natural ecology park.
On June, 2005, Sungnae-chun was also resuscitated as a beautiful river through the development project for the ecology river. It was a dried river due to the low volume of water flow during the 1970s~the 1980s. But in 2009 it was selected as 'the most beautiful 100 rivers in Korea' by Land, Transport and Maritime Affairs.
If the four rivers in 'waterway' are the main artery, a streamlet is a vessel. Songpa District developed a streamlet alongside South Beltway (1.5 km from Ogeum intersection ~ Olympic Park intersection ~ Seongnae Stream), easing hot island phenomena and reclaiming water at the same time.

Free bicycle rental SPB system

"Rent a bicycle and return it at any among 300 rental sites."
Songpa has a free bicycle rent system called "Songpa Public Use Bike" or SPB, the nation's first of its kind, in which members of the system rent a bicycle free of charge 24 hours from 300 self-rental sites located every 300 meters away from one another.
With a SPB membership card, one can rent a bicycle and return it at any site among 300 in Songpa. SPB system upgraded Korea's bicycle culture for sure.

Expansion of bicycle infrastructure

"There are free bicycle rental houses on the 101.81km long bicycle road."
Songpa made a huge success in initiating a handful of systems relating bicycle that other municipal governments rush to benchmark.
There are four free bicycle rental houses on the 101.8 km long bicycle road. Anyone with an identification card can rent a bicycle free of charge. The system plays a role in saving transportation costs and promoting bicycle riding at the same time.
There is a "Home-visiting bicycle repair" in Songpa, a system designed to relieve repair expense. Under the system, mechanics visit Songpa-gu offices, schools and apartments so that residents do not have to go too far to repair their bicycles.

Parks

"Songpa District has as many as 140 parks, the largest number among municipal districts in Seoul and has the highest green zone rate in Seoul."

A third of the total Songpa area is green zone: 10.98k m2 or 32.4% of Songpa area is green zone, the highest rate among municipal districts in Seoul. Songpa District has as many as 140 parks, also the largest number in Seoul.
Each park has its own theme like a flower or a plant reflected by residents' opinion. The theme of Geon-neomal Park in Garak-dong is a rose, while Baekto Park is a wild flower park. The theme of Macheon Park is a royal azalea and Jamsil Park's main theme is aquatic plant. In these parks, diverse flower festivals and events including Royal Azalea Festival, Rose Festival, Garden Balsam Dyeing Festival, Eco Culture Class, Wild Plants Operation and Aquatic Plant Exhibition are held every year.

There are cherry blossom roads alongside of Seongnae stream and Jangjicheon stream. As the trees were donated by Songpa residents and are planted by them, each tree has a name tag of the donator and is taken a good care by them. Songpa led its people to voluntarily take part in preserving the environment in the district.

Convenient traffic
"Roadways in Songpa are accessible to any direction."
Songpa District expands the road system and optimize the traffic system to respond to the probable increase in traffic volume in near future due to city planning such as Songpa New Town Project, construction of distribution unit in the Southeastern Area Project and Munjeong-dong Development Project.
The 3rd step of the new subway line number 9, the 8 km section, is scheduled to be completed by 2015. Subway line number 3 is planned to be extended to Suseo, Garak Market and Ogeum station in an effort for more balanced development.
Songpa plans to extend Tan stream bank alongside Songpadaero as traffic volume on the street is expected to increase. Songpa will also ease traffic by constructing a road linking Wiryeseong gil to Seongnae stream, and by connecting the unconnected section under Olympic Bridge.
Subway transfer center that is to be constructed on Jamsil Intersection, the most congested area, will ease traffic on the roads as more traffic is expected due to the second Lotte World building with 112 stories.

Administrative divisions

Transportation

Railroad

Notable people from Songpa District
 Hyun Bin (Born: Kim Tae-pyung, Hangul: 김태평), South Korean actor
 Chan (Born: Jung Chan-woo,  Hangul: 정찬우), singer, dancer, actor and K-pop idol, member of K-pop group iKon
 Ahn Seongmin (Hangul: 안성민), singer, dancer, and K-pop idol, member of K-pop group Cravity
Lee Soo-jin (Hangul: 이수진), singer, dancer, and K-pop idol, member and leader of K-pop group Weeekly

See also

Gangnam District
Geography of South Korea

References

External links
 Official homepage 

 
Districts of Seoul